Arendal is a municipality in Agder county in southeastern Norway. Arendal belongs to the region of Sørlandet. The administrative centre of the municipality is the city of Arendal (which is also the seat of Agder county). Some of the notable villages in Arendal include Rykene, Eydehavn, Færvik, Strengereid, Kongshavn, Kilsund, Brattekleiv, Torsbudalen, Longum, Saltrød, Staubø, Vrengen, and Kolbjørnsvik. The offices of UNEP/GRID-Arendal are also located in the city of Arendal.

The  municipality is the 273rd largest by area out of the 356 municipalities in Norway. Arendal is the 23rd most populous municipality in Norway with a population of 45,509.

General information

Municipal history
The town of Arendal was established as a municipality on 1 January 1838 (see formannskapsdistrikt law). On 1 January 1875, a small area with 22 inhabitants was transferred from the town to the neighboring municipality of Østre Moland and another small area with 52 residents was transferred to the neighboring municipality of Øyestad.

On 1 January 1902, the rural municipality of Barbu (population: 6,787) was merged into the town of Arendal. In 1944, a small area of Moland with a population of 21 inhabitants was transferred to Arendal as well. On 1 January 1992, the town was vastly expanded. The neighboring rural municipalities of Hisøy (pop: 4,026), Moland (pop: 8,148), Tromøy (pop: 4,711), and Øyestad (pop: 8,679) were all merged with the town of Arendal which had a population of 12,478, bringing the total population of the new municipality of Arendal to 38,042.

Origin of the name
The Old Norse form of the name was probably Arnardalr. The first element is the genitive case of ǫrn which means "eagle" and the last element is dalr which means "valley" or "dale", thus meaning the "valley of the eagle".

A link for the name  also has been theorized to the Vasconic substrate hypothesis, for similarity to placenames like Val d'Aran and Arundel.

Coat of arms
The coat of arms of Arendal were granted on 7 November 1924 (based upon an older seal). The blue and silver arms show a sailing ship as a symbol for the importance of fisheries and sailing to the local economy. A ship appeared on the oldest known seal of the town, dating back to the 17th century. In the late 19th and early 20th century the arms showed the ship in the upper part and a landscape with the coat of arms of Norway in the base of the shield.

Churches

The Church of Norway has six parishes within the municipality of Arendal. It is part of the Arendal prosti (deanery) in the Diocese of Agder og Telemark.

History

The village of Arendal was established in the middle of the 16th century, and was then called Arendall. Initially, it had no formal town status.

When the town of Christianssand was founded by King Christian IV in 1641, he granted the citizens a monopoly on all trade in Nedenæs and Lister og Mandal counties (including the area of Arendal). This grant, intended to subsidize Christianssand and its fortifications, placed existing towns in a difficult position. Both towns and the peasants in the rural countryside protested the hardships this caused. As a result, Arendal received royal permission in 1622 to continue as a loading-place for timber until a means could be found to transfer its trade to Christianssand.

The town of Arendal was given market city privileges in 1723. However the peasants in the surrounding district, who by law were to sell their goods only at Arendal, were smuggling their goods out on cutters and selling them in Denmark, in the Baltic, and in Great Britain.

This continued until 1735, when Arendal was granted a full town charter. This charter, combined with Danish imposition of a monopoly on grain imports, caused great poverty and starvation among the peasants in the surrounding districts, leading to several famous rebellions.

As a result of the rebellions, the age of privileges for towns like Christianssand and Arendal came to an apparent end in 1768 by royal proclamation. But the problems did not end then; a farmer, Christian Jensen Lofthuus, in nearby Vestre Moland led a rebellion in 1786 which resulted in the government actually remedying some of the most repressive trade policies, but Lofthus died in prison. The charges against Lofthus were that he dealt in grain and other commodities to the detriment to Arendal's privileges.

Shipping, shipbuilding, and timber trade as well as mining and ironworks were important branches of industry in Nedenæs county for many centuries, especially in the Arendal region. Frequent contacts with the world abroad put their mark on the local culture and traditions. In 1880, it was the country's biggest port in terms of tonnage handled. At the end of the 19th century, Arendal was recognized as a major shipping centre with many wealthy shipowners. However, this came to an end following the 1886 Arendal crash, in which Axel Nicolai Herlofson had defrauded many bank customers in the city, leading to bankruptcies and extreme unemployment. At one point in the middle of the 18th century, Arendal was one of Norway's biggest mining towns. The main production consisted of iron ore and magnetite.

Around the turn of the twentieth century, when thousands of Norwegians sought to take advantage of the more stable economic climate of the United States by emigrating, many of those from Arendal took their economic traditions with them. In New York City and the surrounding areas, a great deal of Americans who claim Norwegian ancestry can trace their roots to Arendal, as a great deal of Norwegian sailors, trimmers, shipbuilders, and carpenters from Arendal settled in areas of New York such as Brooklyn, Port Richmond (Staten Island), and several industrial centers in northern New Jersey such as Jersey City, Bayonne, Perth Amboy, and Elizabeth. In 1939, Arendal had the 4th largest Norwegian tanker fleet; only Oslo, Bergen, and Stavanger were larger.

During the German invasion of Norway on 9 April 1940, Arendal was captured by the German torpedo boat Greif.

Today, the town has small boat manufacturing, mechanical industry, electronics industry, as well as one of the world's largest silicon carbide refining plants.

The municipality had a prison (Arendal Prison), however Agder Prison opened in 2020; Arendal Prison was sold the next year.

Government
All municipalities in Norway, including Arendal, are responsible for primary education (through 10th grade), outpatient health services, senior citizen services, unemployment and other social services, zoning, economic development, and municipal roads. The municipality is governed by a municipal council of elected representatives, which in turn elect a mayor.  The municipality falls under the Agder District Court and the Agder Court of Appeal.

Municipal council
The municipal council of Arendal is made up of 39 representatives that are elected to four year terms. Currently, the party breakdown is as follows:

Geography
The municipality is bordered to the southwest by Grimstad, to the northwest by Froland, to the northeast by Tvedestrand, and to the southeast by the Skaggerak. The lake Rore is located on the Grimstad border along with the river Nidelva.

Arendal is the geologic type locality of the mineral Babingtonite, which was first described from specimens discovered here in 1824.

The coastal municipality includes several populated islands such as Hisøya, Tromøya, Merdø, Flostaøya, and Tverrdalsøya as well as many unpopulated or sparsely populated islands such as Ærøya. The island of Merdø was a major export port in the 17th and 18th centuries and now has a museum, a kiosk, and several beaches. There is regular boat service from Arendal to the island every day during the summer season.

Economy
In 2018 the service sector had 82% of the jobs in the municipality. As of 2020, part of the site for Eyde Energipark, an industrial park, has been leveled: 100 maal or 100,000 sq.m. has been leveled for the first phase of construction of a battery factory (for car batteries and ship batteries), scheduled for 2023.

Attractions

Townscape
In the middle of the town centre of Arendal is an area with wooden houses dating back to the 17th century. This area is called Tyholmen, and is what is left of buildings from before the 19th century. The inner harbour of Arendal is called "Pollen", where the fish market, pubs, and restaurants are located. Trinity Church dominates the skyline of this area.

Arendal has grown from a traditional sleepy summer-town (with culture activities just in the summer) to a more "all year" city. The building of the new library and the combined city hall/concert house has greatly improved culture life.

Lighthouses
The Store Torungen Lighthouse is located on the island of Store Torungen outside Arendal. It was constructed in 1844 and electrified in 1914. It is reachable by a 55-minute boat trip from the town centre. The lighthouse is still in use.

The Lille Torungen Lighthouse is situated on the small island of Lille Torungen outside Arendal. Lille Torungen and Store Torungen were constructed as twin lighthouses, and both are located in the Arendal shipping lane.

The Sandvigodden Lighthouse is also located in Arendal.

Strømsbo gård
Strømsbo gård is a manor house on a historic farm located west of the center of Arendal. The manor dates from the 1760s. From 1804 the manor and farm were owned by members of the Herlofson family. Peter Herlofson took over the farm and gave the building its present form. In 1883, Axel Herlofsen (1845–1910) built the Strømsbo steam sawmill at the head of Strømsbubukt. Nicolai Benjamin Herlofson (1876–1945), former mayor of Arendal, was born and raised at Strømsbo.

Music festivals
 Canal Street is Arendals yearly jazz and blues festival during the summer. It has been arranged since 1996, at that time by the name of Arendal Jazz and Blues Festival. The popularity of the arrangement has been steadily increasing. 
 From 2007 until 2014, the Hove Festival was located on the island of Tromøy just outside Arendal town. It was the largest festival scene in Norway the debut year, and it has an audience capacity of up to 25,000.

Transport
The European route E18 highway is a major transportation route through Arendal heading to Oslo in the northeast and Kristiansand to the southwest. Other main roads in Arendal include the Norwegian County Road 407, Norwegian County Road 408, and Norwegian County Road 410. The local railway line Arendalsbanen runs to Nelaug where it connects with the main Sørlandsbanen railway line, which runs between the cities of Oslo and Stavanger.

The Setesdal Bilruter (on behalf of public transit authority AKT) provides bus connections throughout the Arendal area, the Setesdal region including Froland, as well as to the neighboring towns of Grimstad, Lillesand and Kristiansand, and a handful of their suburbs and outlying villages. A few more destinations can be reached with other bus operators (namely Agder Buss, Nettbuss, Konkurrenten.no, and Lavprisekspressen), including places such as Risør, Tvedestrand, Oslo, and Stavanger. There is also a bus connection to Kristiansand Airport operated by Agder Flyekspress and Nettbuss express (the latter on behalf of Flybussen.no). Ferries run between the city center and the islands of Hisøya and Tromøya. Arendal does also have an airport, Arendal Airport, Gullknapp, although it does not have any commercial airlines regularly stopping here.

Healthcare
The municipality organises general practitioner services, such as the primary doctor scheme, accident and emergency departments, physiotherapy, public health centers and school medical services, home nursing care, midwifery services and nursing homes or living arrangements for around-the-clock nursing and care. Sørlandet Hospital has a visiting location in Arendal and offers specialist health services in somatics, psychiatry and addiction treatment.

Climate
The climate along the southern coast is temperate. Arendal has a significant amount of rainfall during the year. This is true, even for the driest month. The climate here is classified as temperate oceanic (Cfb by the Köppen-Geiger system). The all-time low is from January 1942, and the all-time high is from June 1995. The average date for the last overnight freeze (low below ) in spring is 11 April and average date for first freeze in autumn is 17 November giving a frost-free season of 219 days (1981-2010 average for Torungen). The data is from Torungen, a coastal station. Only slighly further inland, the winters get colder and the summer days get warmer. With southeasterly airflow in winter, the area can get heavy snowfall, which can interrupt traffic. However, the snow rarely lasts long along the coast.

International relations

Twin towns — sister cities
Arendal has sister city agreements with the following places:

In fiction
The area around Arendal was the location for the 1997 Lille Lørdag series "Min drømmeserie" starring Harald Eia and Bård Tufte Johansen.
The 2013 Disney film Frozen is set in a fictional kingdom named Arendelle, which is derived from and loosely based on the city of Arendal.

Notable residents

Public service and public thinking 
 Jens Munk (1579–1628), Dano-Norwegian navigator and explorer, searched for the Northwest Passage to India
 Andreas Frederik Krieger (1817–1893), politician, government minister and supreme court judge
 Anton Christian Houen (1823–1894), Norwegian teacher, philanthropist and businessman
 Yngvar Nielsen (1843–1916), Norwegian historian, politician and geographer
 Sam Eyde (1866–1940), Norwegian engineer and industrialist, founded Norsk Hydro
 Magnus Olsen (1878–1963), Norwegian philologist, specialized in Old Norse studies
 Lucy Pedersen, climate change activist 
 Alf Dannevig (1886–1960), marine biologist and mayor of Hisøy from 1948 to 1960
 Sigrid Stray (1893–1978), Norwegian barrister and proponent of women's rights
 Sigurd Anderson (1904–1990), the 19th Governor of South Dakota, 1951 to 1955
 Ebba Lodden (1913–1997), civil servant and politician, first female county governor in Norway 
 Lilly Bølviken (1914–2011), Norwegian judge, women's rights advocate and first woman Supreme Court Justice from 1968 to 1984
 Aksel Lydersen (1919–1995), engineer and professor of chemical engineering
 Svenn Stray (1922–2012), politician, twice Foreign Minister of Norway
 Magnhild Lien (born ca.1955), Norwegian mathematician specializing in knot theory 
 Grete Faremo (born 1955), former Norwegian politician, lawyer and business leader
 Hege Storhaug (born 1962), political and human rights activist, journalist, author

Arts 

 Ole Nilsen Weierholt (1718–1792), wood carver and pattern maker for ironworks
 Sophie Dedekam (1820–1894), Norwegian composer and diarist
 Louis Moe (1857–1945), Norwegian painter, illustrator and writer
 Tillie Baldwin (1888–1958), American rodeo contestant and performer in Wild West shows
 Trygve Thorsen (1892–1965), Norwegian sculptor of busts and reliefs
 Bård Torstensen (born 1961), guitarist for rap metal band Clawfinger
 Karl Ove Knausgård (born 1968), writer, raised on Tromøya in Arendal
 Finn Iunker (born 1969), playwright
 Kristin Danielsen (born 1972), dancer, choreographer and cultural administrator
 Øyvind Sauvik (born 1976), hip hop musician

Sport 

 Dan Evensen (born 1974), Norwegian mixed martial arts fighter
 Monica Knudsen (born 1975), former footballer with 87 caps with Norway women and team gold medallist at the 2000 Summer Olympics 
 Øystein Grødum (born 1977), speedskater, competed in the 2006 Winter Olympics
 Sisters Annette Bjelkevik (born 1978) and Hedvig Bjelkevik (born 1981), Norwegian speed skaters, competed at the 2006 Winter Olympics
 Twins Roger Risholt and Kai Risholt (born 1979), retired Norwegian footballers 
 Marit Fiane Christensen (born 1980), footballer with 86 caps with the Norwegian women's national football team 
 Glenn Andersen (born 1980), retired Norwegian footballer with 437 club caps
 Jan Gunnar Solli (born 1981), footballer with 350 club caps and 40 for the Norwegian men's national football team
 Håvard Vad Petersson (born 1984), curler, team silver medallist at the 2010 Winter Olympics
 Marte Olsbu Røiseland (born 1990), biathlete and silver medallist at the 2018 Winter Olympics

References

External links

 Municipal fact sheet from Statistics Norway 
  
 Arendal official tourist information  
 Arendal tourist information from Reiselivsbasen 
 UNEP/GRID-Arendal, UN Environment Programme office in Arendal 
 Arendal on Google Maps
 Map of Aust-Agder including Arendal municipality  
 Municipality of Arendal 
 Agderposten — The leading newspaper covering Aust-Agder, with base in Arendal 
 County museum & archive: Aust-Agder kulturhistoriske center 
 Webcam of Arendal centre 
 Canal Street – Arendal Jazz and Blues festival 

 
Municipalities of Agder
1838 establishments in Norway